In English, the planet Mars is named after Mars, the Roman god of war, an association made because of its red color, which suggests blood. That is because of the Greek equivalent to Mars is Ares. From this come technical terms such as areology, as well as the (rare) adjective Arean and the star name Antares.

Mars is also the basis of the name of the month of March (from Latin  'month of Mars'), as well as of Tuesday (Latin  'day of Mars'), where the old Anglo-Saxon god Tíw was identified as the Anglo-Saxon equivalent to Mars by Interpretatio germanica.

Due to the global influence of European languages in astronomy, a word like Mars or Marte for the planet is common around the world, though it may be used alongside older, native words. A number of other languages have provided words with international usage. For example:
 Arabic   – which connotes fire – is used as the (or a) name for the planet in Persian, Urdu, Malay and Swahili, among others
 Chinese  [Mandarin ] 'fire star' (in Chinese the five classical planets are identified with the five elements) is used in Korean, Japanese and Vietnamese.
 India uses the Sanskrit term Mangal derived from the Hindu goddess Mangala.
 A long-standing nickname for Mars is the "Red Planet".
 The archaic Latin form  is seen, but only very rarely, in English, though the adjectives Mavortial and Mavortian mean 'martial' in the military rather than planetary sense.

References

Mars
Names